Mary Jane Wallner (born October 25, 1946) is a Democratic member of the New Hampshire House of Representatives, one of the three members representing the Merrimack 10th District since 1980. She served as the Majority Leader from 2007 to 2010.

External links
The New Hampshire House of Representatives - Mary Jane Wallner official NH government website
Project Vote Smart - Representative Mary Jane Wallner (NH) profile
Follow the Money - Mary Jane Wallner
2006 2004 2002 2000 1998 campaign contributions

Democratic Party members of the New Hampshire House of Representatives
Living people
Women state legislators in New Hampshire
1946 births
Politicians from St. Louis
21st-century American politicians
21st-century American women politicians